Urceola  may refer to:
 Urceola (fungus), Quél. 1886, a genus of fungi in the order Helotiales
 Urceola (plant), Roxb. 1799, a genus of plants in the family Apocynoideae

See also
 Urceolate, shaped like an urn or pitcher